Do Me a Favour was the second novel written by Susan Hill, published in 1963.

References

Novels by Susan Hill
1963 British novels
Hutchinson (publisher) books